Albert Hofman (born 10 April 2003) is a Romanian professional footballer who plays as a forward for Liga I club Universitatea Cluj.

Club career
He made his Liga I debut for Universitatea Cluj on 5 August 2022, in a 0–1 loss to Petrolul Ploiești.

References

External links
 
 

2003 births
Living people
People from Câmpulung Moldovenesc
Romanian footballers
Association football forwards
Liga I players
Liga II players
FC Universitatea Cluj players
Romania youth international footballers